Dejvice is a historical community, a municipal quarter of the Prague 6 district of Prague, Czech Republic. Its history can be traced back to the late Roman era.  Dejvice is known for its appeal to the upper middle class, foreign diplomatic corps and as a university district. It is also the home to Dukla Prague, one of the most successful football clubs of the Czechoslovak era.

History 

While it is difficult to pinpoint the exact time in which Dejvice came into existence, archeologists have uncovered a pit that dates back to the late Roman Era.  This find is the first preserved archeological site in Prague history.  Other than this not much is known until the 10th century when Dejvice, and other towns in the current Prague 6 municipality, came under the auspices of the Břevnov Monastery.  The history of modern Dejvice begins in the 1920s. During this time the city was an affluent neighborhood of Prague.  Orchards were planted on the surrounding hills.  Václav Havel lived in Dejvice during this time.  The tram line was established incorporate with a trolleybus by wartime. The build up of the quarter also continued. From the Victory Square it sequentially shifted to the North to  neighborhood. During the war, the Hotel International Prague was completed in 1950 and was intended to mimic the architecture of Moscow.  After the fall of communism it was renamed the "Hotel Crowne Plaza".  The town surrounds a square entitled, Vítězné náměstí (The Victorious square).  In 1978 the metro line was extended to Dejvice (station was named Leninova, now it is Dejvická). Today's motorway, called Evropska also appeared at that time. That time it was also called Leninova. The airport, united with the center of Prague, and that newly built neighborhood, by a sequence of primary streets.

Character of the quarter 

The architecture of Dejvice was greatly influenced by Czech architect Antonín Engel during the 1920s, when he developed new housing settlements that still stand today.  Dejvice is a relatively luxurious residential quarter, catering to the educated elite.

Dejvice is a home to multiple universities with many students. It is home to the main campus of Czech Technical University, University of Chemistry and Technology, newly built Czech National Library of Technology, as well as Catholic Theological Faculty of Charles University.

Notable residents
First Czech President Václav Havel lived in Dejvice during his presidency.

Hanspaulka league

The Hanspaulka League, which was the most popular amateur football league in Czechoslovakia, originated in Dejvice. It began in 1972 with eight teams.  The league has now grown to over 790 teams.  The league is broken into eight divisions based on skill and quality of play.  Each game features six players per side and are played on small pitches. The league began four years after the Soviet suppression of the Prague Spring as a means of self-determination for the Czechs. It was staffed by many of the intellectuals and students who participated in the 1968 events.

Transport 

Dejvice is linked with the center of Prague by tram lines (8, 18, 20, 26). The metro line A stop's in Dejvice at the Dejvická metro station, and gets to the heart of the city in minutes.

See also
 (Hanspaulka league)

References

Notes
 
 

Prague 6